Ashis Pradhan (born 5 June 1999) is an Indian professional footballer who plays as a central midfielder for I-League club RoundGlass Punjab.

Career
Born in Sikkim, he hails from a Nepali Newar family. Pradhan started his career in his home state with the Namchi Sports Hostel. In 2012, he was selected to join the AIFF Regional Academy after being successful in a trial. After two years, Pradhan moved to the Tata Football Academy where he graduated from in 2018.

On 2 January 2018, Pradhan appeared on the bench for the first time in his professional career for Indian Arrows, an All India Football Federation I-League development club. On 23 February 2018, Pradhan made his professional debut for the Arrows in a league match against Aizawl. He came on as an 85th-minute substitute for Suresh Singh Wangjam as Indian Arrows lost 3–0.

For the 2018–19 season, Pradhan joined the ATK Reserves before being promoted to the senior squad.

International
Pradhan has been selected for the India under-20 side.

Career statistics

References

External links 
 Indian Super League profile.

1999 births
Living people
People from Gangtok
Indian footballers
Tata Football Academy players
Indian Arrows players
ATK (football club) players
Association football midfielders
Footballers from Sikkim
I-League players
India youth international footballers